Spy of Napoleon is a 1936 British historical drama film directed by Maurice Elvey and starring Richard Barthelmess, Dolly Haas, Frank Vosper, Henry Oscar and James Carew. It is based on the 1934 novel A Spy of Napoleon by Baroness Emmuska Orczy, best known for writing The Scarlet Pimpernel.

Plot
An illegitimate daughter of Louis Napoleon is taken on as an agent by Napoleon III, ruler of France, who wishes her to spy on the aristocracy whom he suspects of wanting to overthrow him.

Cast
 Richard Barthelmess - Gerard de Lanoy 
 Dolly Haas - Eloise 
 Frank Vosper - Napoleon III
 Francis L. Sullivan - Chief of Police 
 Joyce Bland -  Empress Eugenie
 C. Denier Warren - Benicolet 
 Henry Oscar - Hugo Blot 
 Marjorie Mars - Anna 
 Brian Buschell - Phillippe St. Paul 
 Lyn Harding - Bismarck
 Wilfrid Caithness - Von Moltke 
 George Merritt - Prussian Consul 
 Stafford Hillard - Newspaper seller
 James Carew - Gatling

References

External links

1936 films
1930s spy drama films
British spy drama films
British black-and-white films
1930s English-language films
Films based on British novels
Films directed by Maurice Elvey
Films set in 1870
Films set in 1871
Films set in France
Franco-Prussian War films
Films shot at Twickenham Film Studios
Cultural depictions of Napoleon III
Films based on works by Emma Orczy
British historical drama films
1930s historical drama films
1936 drama films
Films shot at Station Road Studios, Elstree
1930s British films